The Korpeje–Kordkuy pipeline is a  long natural gas pipeline from Korpeje field north of Okarem in western Turkmenistan to Kordkuy in Iran.   of pipeline run in Turkmenistan while  run in Iran.

In October 1995, National Iranian Oil Company decided to build the pipeline to supply the remote northern part of Iran. The pipeline was built in 1997 and it cost US$190 million. Iran financed 90% of construction costs, which was later paid back by gas deliveries.

The pipeline was inaugurated on 29 December 1997 by presidents Saparmurat Niyazov and Mohammad Khatami.

See also

 Dauletabad–Salyp Yar pipeline

References

1997 establishments in Iran
1997 establishments in Turkmenistan
Energy in Central Asia
Energy infrastructure completed in 1997
Iran–Turkmenistan relations
Natural gas pipelines in Iran
Natural gas pipelines in Turkmenistan